Rodrigo Alejandro Barra Carrasco (born 24 September 1975) was a Chilean professional footballer.
 
He played for Santiago Wanderers.

Honours

Club
Santiago Wanderers
 Primera División de Chile (1): 2001

Deportes Antofagasta
 Primera B (2): 2011 Apertura, 2011

External links
Profile at Terra.cl 

1975 births
Living people
People from Malleco Province
Chilean footballers
Chile international footballers
Association football defenders
Puerto Montt footballers
Ñublense footballers
Cobresal footballers
Quesos Kümey footballers
Rangers de Talca footballers
Deportes Iberia footballers
Deportes Temuco footballers
Santiago Wanderers footballers
Chilean Primera División players
Primera B de Chile players
2001 Copa América players